The Kuznetsov NK-4 is a turboprop engine, designed by the Kuznetsov Design Bureau.

Development
Development of the NK-4 began on September 27, 1955 at the Kuznetsov Design Bureau. Factory tests where passed on April 17, 1956 and state tests where passed in 1957. At the time, the NK-4 was considered an economical and technologically advanced engine.

A modified version of the NK-4 that improved in terms of service life and efficiency, the NK-4A, passed factory tests in October 1957. State tests of the NK-4A where passed in June 1959.

Applications
 Antonov An-10 (prototype)
 Ilyushin Il-18A

Specifications (NK-4)

See also

References

1950s turboprop engines
Kuznetsov aircraft engines